Eron Santos Lourenço, better known as Eron is a Brazilian football player who plays as left back and is currently contracted to Atlético Mineiro.

Career
The athlete arrived at the club in 2005 and during this period, was summoned to the selections under-15 and U-16. On August 24, 2010, first appeared in the team as a collective in the City of the Rooster . Due to low Leandro and Fernandinho, the player has the option of Vanderlei Luxemburgo for the match against Flamengo. In 2010 the side was part of the delegation that competed in the Copa São Paulo de Futebol Júnior in January.

Career statistics
(Correct )

References

External links
 Galo Digital
 soccerway

1992 births
Living people
Brazilian footballers
Clube Atlético Mineiro players
Atlético Clube Goianiense players
Goiás Esporte Clube players
Campeonato Brasileiro Série A players
Association football defenders
Footballers from Belo Horizonte